Petr Michl (born 3 November 1970) is a Czech former cross-country skier. He competed at the 1998 Winter Olympics, the 2002 Winter Olympics and the 2006 Winter Olympics.

References

External links
 

1970 births
Living people
Czech male cross-country skiers
Olympic cross-country skiers of the Czech Republic
Cross-country skiers at the 1998 Winter Olympics
Cross-country skiers at the 2002 Winter Olympics
Cross-country skiers at the 2006 Winter Olympics
People from Opočno
Sportspeople from the Hradec Králové Region